Åkerfelt is a surname. Notable people with the surname include:

Harry Åkerfelt (1915–2008), Finnish sprint canoeist
Rainer Åkerfelt (born 1934), Finnish sprint canoeist
Rolf Åkerfelt (born 1941), Finnish sprint canoeist

See also
Mikael Åkerfeldt (born 1974), Swedish musician